Oyster River High School (ORHS), part of the Oyster River Cooperative School District (ORCSD), is a public high school located in Durham, New Hampshire, United States, with an enrollment of nearly 800 students. It serves Durham and the neighboring communities of Lee, and Madbury. The high school opened, and the first graduating class was in 1956. Dean Sackett was the Chairman of the School Board, Arthur E. Toll was the Superintendent of Schools, John H. Day was Principal, and George W. Pasichuke was the Associate Principal. The school yearbook is named Trion, named by Margaret Campbell in a school-wide contest. The high school moved to its present site on October 22, 1964.

In 2004 the school underwent a major renovation and expansion to its facilities, including a new gym, theater, classroom wing, and science wing, costing over $22 million.

Academics
11th-grade students who take the NECAP standardized tests scoring an average of at or above the statewide scores in that year. In 2014, Newsweek ranked the school 110th in the nation.

Athletics

Boys' soccer and girls' cross-country have each won several state championships.

The boys' soccer team won three consecutive state championships from 2001-2003, losing only 1 game in 2002 and going undefeated in 2003.

The girls' basketball team went undefeated in the 2005-2006 season to bring home a state championship and won the state championship in the 2008-2009 season. The boys' indoor track team won a state championship during the 2006-2007 season. The boys' and girls' swimming and diving teams have each captured multiple state championships. The boys' team captured five consecutive titles from 2007-2012. In the 2010 season, the girls' volleyball team went undefeated, winning the Division II state championship, and the boys' cross country and indoor track teams won the newly created Division II championships. The boys' cross country team won another state championship in 2011. In 2015, the boys' soccer team defeated Portsmouth High School to win the Division II championship.

The official school color is royal blue, also known as "Bobcat Blue" or "Oyster River Blue", but most of the teams wear white jerseys when playing at home games. However, unlike their fellow teams, the ice hockey team wears navy blue and red.

Administration
The administration of ORHS is led by Principal Suzanne Filippone, who assumed her role before the 2016-17 school year. For the previous three years, Filippone had been Assistant Principal at Spaulding High School in Rochester, New Hampshire, and was hired after the previous ORHS principal, Todd Allen, accepted the position of Assistant Superintendent of Oyster River Cooperative School District. She was also a teacher at Berwick Academy. The vice-principals of ORHS are Mark Milliken and Mike McCann. The current superintendent of the school is Dr. James Morse, Sr.

Notable alumni
Jack Edwards, sportscaster
Ethan Gilsdorf, author
Joyce Maynard, author
Lincoln Peirce, author of comic strip Big Nate
Carol Shea-Porter, U.S. congresswoman
Robert Eggers, film director and screenwriter

External links
Oyster River High School official website
Oyster River Alumni Association
Durham Friends

References

Schools in Strafford County, New Hampshire
Public high schools in New Hampshire
Durham, New Hampshire
1989 establishments in New Hampshire